Krasnoufimsky District is an administrative district (raion), one of the thirty in Sverdlovsk Oblast, Russia. As a municipal division, it is incorporated as Krasnoufimsky Urban Okrug. Its administrative center is the town of Krasnoufimsk (which is not administratively a part of the district). Population: 28,077 (2010 Census);

Administrative and municipal status
Within the framework of administrative divisions, Krasnoufimsky District is one of the thirty in the oblast. The town of Krasnoufimsk serves as its administrative center, despite being incorporated separately as an administrative unit with the status equal to that of the districts.

As a municipal division, the district is incorporated as Krasnoufimsky Urban Okrug. The Town of Krasnoufimsk is incorporated separately from the district as Krasnoufimsk Urban Okrug.

References

Notes

Sources

Districts of Sverdlovsk Oblast

